Anette Kramme (born 10 October 1967) is a German lawyer and politician of the SPD who has served as a member of the Bundestag from the state of Bavaria since 1998. Since 2013, she has been serving as Parliamentary State Secretary at the Federal Ministry of Labour and Social Affairs in the government of Chancellor Angela Merkel.

Political career 
Kramme first became a member of the Bundestag in the 1998 German federal election. In this capacity, she has served on the Committee on Labour and Social Affairs (1998-2013) and the Committee on Legal Affairs (2002-2005). From 2009 until 2013, she was her parliamentary group's spokesperson on social policy.

In the negotiations to form a Grand Coalition of the Christian Democrats (CDU together with the Bavarian CSU) and the SPD following the 2013 federal elections, Kramme was part of the SPD delegation in the working group on labor policy, led by Ursula von der Leyen and Andrea Nahles. She has since been serving as Parliamentary State Secretary at the Federal Ministry of Labour and Social Affairs, under successive ministers Andrea Nahles (2013-2017) and Hubertus Heil (since 2017).

In the negotiations on a fourth coalition government under Merkel's leadership following the 2017 federal elections, Kramme was part of the working group on social affairs, this time led by Nahles, Karl-Josef Laumann and Barbara Stamm.

Other activities 
 German United Services Trade Union (ver.di), Member
 IG Metall, Member

References

External links 

  
 Bundestag biography 

1967 births
Living people
Members of the Bundestag for Bavaria
Female members of the Bundestag
21st-century German women politicians
Members of the Bundestag 2021–2025
Members of the Bundestag 2017–2021
Members of the Bundestag 2013–2017
Members of the Bundestag 2009–2013
Members of the Bundestag 2005–2009
Members of the Bundestag 2002–2005
Members of the Bundestag 1998–2002
Members of the Bundestag for the Social Democratic Party of Germany
Parliamentary State Secretaries of Germany
People from Essen
German women lawyers
20th-century German lawyers